S10 Baoshan–Tengchong Expressway also known as Baoteng Expressway is a province-level expressway in Yunnan, China. It connects the city of Baoshan and Tengchong. The expressway was built between 2007 and 2016. The total cost of the expressway is approximately 4.6 billion Yuan, about 71.97 million Yuan per kilometer. It is also the first expressway which built up at volcano area in China.

References

Expressways in Yunnan
Transport in Baoshan, Yunnan